The list of ship launches in 1767 includes a chronological list of some ships launched in 1767.


References

1767
Ship launches